Beggars of Life is an American film directed by William Wellman and starring Wallace Beery and Richard Arlen as hobos, and Louise Brooks as a young woman who dresses as a young man and flees the law. The film is regarded as Brooks's best American movie.

The actress recounted her memories of working on the film in her essay, “On Location with Billy Wellman,” which is included in her 1982 book, Lulu in Hollywood.

Beggars of Life was released as both a silent and sound film (the latter with added music, sound effects, and dialogue) in September 1928. The sound sequences, which included train noises and Beery singing a song, are now considered lost. This was Paramount's first feature with spoken dialogue and the first time Beery's voice was recorded for a film, although Beery's spoken dialogue was limited. Today, only the silent version of Beggars of Life is known to survive.

The film is based on Outside Looking In, a stage play by Maxwell Anderson adapted from Jim Tully’s 1924 autobiographical book, Beggars of Life. The play debuted September 7, 1925 at the Greenwich Village Theater. Among those who attended a performance was Charlie Chaplin, who was accompanied by Louise Brooks. Paramount purchased the rights to Tully's book and Anderson's play in early 1928.

Arlen and Brooks had appeared together the previous year in Rolled Stockings, which is considered a lost film. Beery and Brooks had appeared together the previous year in Now We're in the Air, which was considered a lost film until 2016 when an incomplete copy was found in Czech Republic.

In 2017, the best surviving copy of Beggars of Life was released on DVD and Blu-ray by Kino Lorber.

Cast
Wallace Beery as Oklahoma Red
Louise Brooks as The Girl (Nancy)
Richard Arlen as The Boy (Jim)
(Robert Perry)(Bob Perry)  as The Arkansaw Snake
Blue Washington as Black Mose
Roscoe Karns as Lame Hoppy
Robert Brower as Blind Sims (uncredited)
Frank Brownlee as the Farmer (uncredited)
Jacques (Jack) Chapin as Ukie (uncredited)
Andy Clark as Skelly (uncredited)
Mike Donlin as Bill (uncredited)
George Kotsonaros as Baldy (uncredited)
Kewpie Morgan as Skinny (uncredited)
Guinn "Big Boy" Williams as Baker's Cart Driver (uncredited)

See also
Miss Nobody (1926)
Wild Boys of the Road (1933)

References

Sources

External links
 
 
 
 The AFI Catalog of Feature Films: Beggars of Life
 Beggars of Life at SilentEra
 Beggars of Life at Louise Brooks Society
 Beggars of Life at Virtual History

1928 films
1928 adventure films
1928 crime drama films
American crime drama films
American LGBT-related films
American black-and-white films
Cross-dressing in American films
Fictional hoboes
Films directed by William A. Wellman
Paramount Pictures films
Rail transport films
1920s LGBT-related films
Transitional sound films
Films scored by Karl Hajos
1920s American films